Siegfried Ballerstedt (born 5 December 1937) is a German former water polo player. He competed at the 1964 Summer Olympics and the 1968 Summer Olympics.

References

External links
 

1937 births
Living people
German male water polo players
Olympic water polo players of the United Team of Germany
Olympic water polo players of East Germany
Water polo players at the 1964 Summer Olympics
Water polo players at the 1968 Summer Olympics
People from Aschersleben
Sportspeople from Saxony-Anhalt